But What If This Is Love is a 1961 Soviet teen drama film directed by Yuli Raizman.

Plot 
A teacher in class takes a letter from a pupil who found it on the floor. Being of very strict morals, the teacher first carries the letter to the headmistress, and then instructs one of the pupils of the class to find out by whom it was written. In the course of subsequent events, it is discovered that the letter was written by Boris Ramzin, to his classmate and deskmate Ksenia Zavyalova. Frightened by this revelation, Ksenia does not dare to go to school the next day. Seeing her indecision and confusion, Boris offers to skip classes and go to the forest together. In the forest, they get caught in the rain and find shelter in an old dilapidated church. There, for the first time, they talk about their feelings aloud, because previously only correspondence was conducted. Meanwhile, Ksenia is summoned home: she hasn't come back from school on time, and her younger sister publicly announced her friend saw Ksenia leaving for the forest in the company of a boy. Ksenia's mother is infuriated, and when Ksenia returns home, she slaps her in the face. The next day, the lovers are waiting to have an explanation in the director's office. As a result of all these events, Ksenia closes in on herself. She is afraid to leave the house, her relationships grow suspect, and everyone around her seems to be mocking her. Boris shows courage and is not afraid of ridicule, because love is not a crime. Classmates of children are understanding, but teachers and other adults differ in their views: some see in their relations a violation of decency and undermining of "moral foundations", some — a wonderful feeling in which you do not need to interfere, especially so unceremoniously. Ksenia's mother, who repented of her behavior, makes it clear to her daughter that men have "one thing on their mind" and therefore she should not believe Boris. Ksenia is torn by contradictions: she reaches out to Boris and simultaneously agrees that he should leave. Driven to desperation, she tries to poison herself, which classmates learn from one of the students in a German lesson. In the final episode, the characters of the film meet a few months later. Ksenia was in the hospital, and Boris was leaving with his father on an expedition. Boris still loves the girl, but her feelings seem to be undermined as a result of the emotional trauma experienced. Ksenia informs Boris that she will go to study in Novosibirsk. Boris offers to go with her, but Ksenia's reaction is uncertain. Boris looks after the retreating girl.

Cast 
 Zhanna Prokhorenko as Ksenia
 Igor Pushkaryov as Boris
 Alexandra Nazarova  as Nadya  
 Nina Shorina as Rita 
 Nadezhda Fedosova as Tatyana, Ksenya's mother
 Evgeny Zharikov as Sergei
 Andrei Mironov as Pyotr
 Viktor Khokhryakov as Pavel Afanasyevich, Boris's father

Release 
22.6 million  Soviet viewers watched the  Raizman's film. This is the 768th place in the history of film distribution in the USSR.

References

External links 
 

1961 films
1960s Russian-language films
Films directed by Yuli Raizman
Mosfilm films
1960s teen drama films
Soviet black-and-white films
Russian teen drama films
Russian black-and-white films
Soviet teen drama films